Arroyo Hondo is a census-designated place in Taos County near Taos, New Mexico, United States. As of the 2010 census it had a population of 474. 

It is historically notable as the site of the killing of six to eight employees by a force of allied Native Americans at Simon Turley's mill and distillery trading post on January 20, 1847. This took place during the Taos Revolt, a populist insurrection of New Mexicans and Native Americans against the new United States territorial regime during the Mexican–American War.

Demographics

Education
It is within Taos Municipal Schools, which operates Taos High School.

See also

 John Dunn Bridge
 Juan Bautista Rael
 Auguste Lacome

References

Census-designated places in New Mexico
Native American history of New Mexico
Census-designated places in Taos County, New Mexico
Taos Revolt